Process Specification is a generic term for the specification of a process. It is not unique to business activity, but can be applied to any organizational activity.  

Within some structured methods, the capitalized term Process Specification refers to a description of the procedure to be followed by an actor within an elementary level business activity, as represented on a process model such as a dataflow diagram or IDEF0 model. A common alias is minispec, short for miniature specification.

Use in systems development

The process specification defines what must be done to transform inputs into outputs. It is a detailed set of instructions outlining a business procedure that each elementary level business activity is expected to carry out. Process specifications are commonly included as integral components of requirements documents in systems development.

Techniques

A variety of approaches can be used to produce a process specification, including:
Decision tables
Structured English (favored technique of most systems analysts)
Pre/post conditions
Use cases, basic course or events/alternate paths in use cases
Flowcharts
Nassi–Shneiderman diagrams
UML Activity diagrams

No matter what approach is used, a specification must communicate to system development designers, implementers and support professionals, and be verifiable by stakeholders and end users.

See also 
 Specification (technical standard)

External links 
Chapter 11 of the Structured Analysis Wiki, by Ed Yourdon

Business process management
Software development process